Hopf is a German surname. Notable people with the surname include:

Eberhard Hopf (1902–1983), Austrian mathematician
Hans Hopf (1916–1993), German tenor
Heinz Hopf (1894–1971), German mathematician
Heinz Hopf (actor) (1934–2001), Swedish actor
Ludwig Hopf (1884–1939), German physicist
Maria Hopf (1914-2008), German botanist and archaeologist

German-language surnames